The Bloemenmarkt is the world's only floating flower market. Founded in 1862, it is sited in Amsterdam, Netherlands, on the Singel canal between Muntplein and Koningsplein in the city's southern canal belt. It has 15 souvenir and gift shops, with only a few still selling fresh flowers. Today, the market is one of the main suppliers of flower bulbs and tulip paraphernalia to tourists visiting Amsterdam.

Gallery

References

External links
 

1862 establishments in the Netherlands
Culture in Amsterdam
Flower markets
Retail markets in Amsterdam
19th-century architecture in the Netherlands